Pere Borrell del Caso (13 December 1835, in Puigcerdà – 16 May 1910, in Barcelona) was a Spanish painter, illustrator and engraver, known for his trompe-l'œil paintings; especially Escaping Criticism (1874).

His father was a cabinetmaker who taught that craft to Borrell. It was by this means that he was able to support his studies at the School of Fine Arts.

He also painted portraits, which made up the bulk of his work, and created religious murals in the Nazarene style in Barcelona, Girona and Castellar del Vallès. These, however, were all destroyed during the Spanish Civil War in the 1930s.

He exhibited throughout Spain and at the 1878 Exposition Universelle. He was twice offered a professorship at the Escola de la Llotja, but preferred to teach at his own private art school. Those who studied there or were influenced by his work include Romà Ribera, Ricard Canals, Adrià Gual and Josep Maria Sert. His children, Julio and Ramón, both became painters of some note.

Puigcerdà's local high school has been named the "Institut Pere Borrell" in his honour. A street there bears his name as well.

References

Further reading

 

1835 births
1910 deaths
Painters from Catalonia
Spanish illustrators
Spanish engravers
People from Cerdanya (comarca)
19th-century Spanish painters
19th-century Spanish male artists
Spanish male painters
20th-century Spanish painters
20th-century Spanish male artists
Trompe-l'œil artists
20th-century engravers